Manliffe Francis Goodbody (20 November 1868 – 24 March 1916) was an Irish tennis and football player.

Career
Goodbody was born on 20 November 1868, at Dublin, the son of Marcus Goodbody and Hannah Woodcock Perry. He represented Ireland at football in 1889 and 1891. In 1894 he finished runner-up to defending champion Robert Wrenn at the  U.S. National Championships in Newport, having earlier beaten Fred Hovey and William Larned. Goodbody reached the quarter-finals of Wimbledon in 1889 and 1893.

Goodbody was defeated in the final of the 1895 London Championships at Queens Club in London by Harry S. Barlow. He also won the North of Ireland Championships held at the Cliftonville Cricket and Lawn Tennis Club in Belfast three times in 1889, 1890 and 1893.

In 1896 Goodbody won the singles title at the Kent Championships in Beckenham after defeating Harry S. Barlow in the final. The next year he lost the challenge round to George Greville in five sets. In April 1897 he won the French Covered Court Championships in Paris after a straight-sets victory in the final against Frank Riseley.

Goodbody died during the First World War as a passenger aboard SS Sussex that was torpedoed by a German submarine in the English Channel on 24 March 1916. He married in 1904 and was survived by his wife, a son, and a daughter.

Grand Slam finals

Singles: 1 (1 runner-up)

References

British male tennis players
Irish male tennis players
1868 births
1916 deaths
19th-century male tennis players
Irish association footballers (before 1923)
Pre-1950 IFA international footballers
Association football defenders
Civilians killed in World War I
Tennis players from Dublin (city)
Deaths due to shipwreck at sea
Association footballers from Dublin (city)